Samuel C. Park (November 1, 1869 – February 19, 1920) was an American politician who served as the Mayor of Salt Lake City from 1912 to 1916.

References

1869 births
1920 deaths
Mayors of Salt Lake City
Utah Republicans